The Men's South American Hockey Championship is together with the field hockey event at the South American Games the official competition for senior men's national field hockey teams of South America. The tournament is held every four years and every two years when there is no field hockey at the South American Games. In 2016 the tournament also was a 2016–17 Men's FIH Hockey World League Round 1 event.

Results

Summaries

Top four statistics

* = host nation

Team appearances

See also
Women's South American Hockey Championship
Field hockey at the South American Games

References

 
South American Championship Men
South American Hockey Championship